Fulcoald is a Germanic masculine given name. Notable people with the name include:

Fulcoald of Farfa (died 750s), abbot between 740 and 759
Fulcoald of Rouergue, count between 820 and 837

Germanic masculine given names